Tom York is an English actor, known for his roles as Samuel "Sam" Carne in Poldark and as Hero in Olympus.

Early life and education 
York graduated from London Academy of Music and Dramatic Art (LAMDA).

Career 
Before landing the leading role in fantasy TV series Olympus in 2015, York featured as the teenage version of one of the main cast in the first 2 episodes of the TV series Tyrant in 2014. After Olympus, in 2016 York appeared as Mike Maddox in Endeavour, as Mitch McCordell in Midsomer Murders, as Leo Richards in Death in Paradise, and as Zac Leeson in Agatha Raisin. In 2017 he was cast as Sam Carne in the BBC hit series Poldark.

Filmography

Television

Stage

Film

References

External links 

 

English actors
Year of birth missing (living people)
Living people